The award for Best Young Belgian Composer is an award given each year at the World Soundtrack Awards. It is given out to commemorate achievement in young Belgian composers. In 2009 and 2010, it was known as the "SABAM Award for Best Young European Composer." It is now known as the "SABAM Award for Best Young International Composer."

Winners and nominees

2002: Alex Otterlei
2003: Michael Vancraeynest
2004: Steven Prengels for Wekker Tam-Tam
2005: Hannes De Maeyer for Medor au téléphone
2006: Alexis Koustoulidis for Le Fauteuil vivant
2007: Werner Viaene for Belgium, The Movie
2008: Cedric Murrath
2009: Christopher Slaski
2010: Karzan Mahmood
2011: Gabriel Heinrich
2012: Valentin Hadjadj
2013: Gilles Alonzo
2014: Cyril Molesti
2015: Peer Kleinschmidt
2016: Sándor Török
2017: Gavin Brivik
2018: Logan Nelson
2019: Pierre Charles

References
List of Awards at worldsoundtrackawards.com
World Soundtrack Award winners 2005
World Soundtrack Award winners 2006
World Soundtrack Award winners 2007
All the winners of WSA since 2001 (in Dutch)

World Soundtrack Awards
Belgian music awards